Artesia High School (AHS) is the public senior high school of Artesia, New Mexico, United States. It is a part of the Artesia Public Schools. The colors of AHS are orange, black and white, and the school's mascot is a Bulldog. Enrollment currently stands at 751.

The school district, of which Artesia High is the sole comprehensive high school, includes: Artesia, Atoka, Hope, Loco Hills, and Morningside.

Academics

Student body statistics

Athletics
AHS competes in the New Mexico Activities Association, and is a AAAAA school in District 4.

Notable alumni
 Mack C. Chase (born 1931), oil and natural gas tycoon
 Charles W. Henderson, author
 Landry Jones, NFL quarterback formerly for the Pittsburgh Steelers, currently with the Dallas Renegades
 Edgar Mitchell, astronaut, during the 1971 Apollo 14 mission became the sixth man to walk on the Moon

Footnotes

Public high schools in New Mexico
Schools in Eddy County, New Mexico